Ali Project (typeset as ALI PROJECT) is a Japanese rock band with a strong Japanese Aristocrat-style image, consisting of  and .

In the band's earlier days, their musical style tended towards light, cheerful and/or refreshing songs. However, the sound has changed in recent times to take on a darker and more mysterious tone. Though there has been a general shift towards performing songs in the "Black Alice" phase, Ali Project has occasionally sung in the White Alice style as well.

Career
The album was later included in Tatsumi Takayuki's book , which led to the band being classified under the progressive rock genre.

Four years later in 1992 they changed their name and made their major debut with their single .

Most of their records are released by Toshiba-EMI, Victor Entertainment and Tokuma Japan. The band is notable in the anime community for having their songs featured in several anime sequences, most notably in the series Noir, Rozen Maiden, Kamichama Karin, .hack//Roots, Linebarrels of Iron, Code Geass, Phantom -Requiem for the Phantom-, Fate/Extra, Shigofumi, and most recently Another along with Katanagatari, Rakudai Kishi no Cavalry and Irina: The Vampire Cosmonaut. Additionally, Mikiya Katakura has also provided the soundtrack to several anime series, such as Kaibutsu Oujo and Avenger.

Overseas Concerts
Ali Project performed their debut concert in the United States at Sakura-Con 2008 in Seattle, Washington. In 2016, the band performed at Anime Boston, and in 2017, they returned to the United States as part of Anisong World Matsuri at Anime Expo in Los Angeles.

Discography

External links

References

Rock music duos
Japanese musical duos
Japanese pop music groups
Japanese progressive rock groups
Anime musical groups
Tokuma Japan Communications artists
Male–female musical duos